Lozanella is a genus of flowering plants belonging to the family Cannabaceae.

Its native range is Mexico to Venezuela and Peru. It is also found in the countries of Bolivia, Colombia, Costa Rica, Ecuador, El Salvador, Guatemala, Honduras and Panamá.

The genus name of Lozanella is in honour of José Filemón Guadalupe Lozano y Lozano (1877 – after 1940), a Mexican traveling companion of Cyrus Pringle during his Mexican expedition. 
It was first described and published in Proc. Amer. Acad. Arts Vol.41 on page 236 in 1905.

Known species, according to Kew;
Lozanella enantiophylla 
Lozanella permollis

References

Cannabaceae
Rosales genera
Plants described in 1905
Flora of Mexico
Flora of Central America
Flora of Venezuela
Flora of western South America